The 2012–13 season will be MTK Budapest FC's 103rd competitive season, 1st consecutive season in the OTP Bank Liga and 124th year in existence as a football club.

First team squad

Transfers

Summer

In:

Out:

Winter

In:

Out:

List of Hungarian football transfers summer 2012
List of Hungarian football transfers winter 2012–13

Statistics

Appearances and goals
Last updated on 2 June 2013.

|-
|colspan="14"|Youth players:

|-
|colspan="14"|Players currently out on loan

|-
|colspan="14"|Players no longer at the club:
|-

|}

Top scorers
Includes all competitive matches. The list is sorted by shirt number when total goals are equal.

Last updated on 2 June 2013

Disciplinary record
Includes all competitive matches. Players with 1 card or more included only.

Last updated on 2 June 2013

Overall
{|class="wikitable"
|-
|Games played || 39 (30 OTP Bank Liga, 2 UEFA Europa League, 1 Hungarian Cup and 6 Hungarian League Cup)
|-
|Games won || 16 (15 OTP Bank Liga, 0 UEFA Europa League, 0 Hungarian Cup and 1 Hungarian League Cup)
|-
|Games drawn || 10 (6 OTP Bank Liga, 1 UEFA Europa League, 1 Hungarian Cup and 2 Hungarian League Cup)
|-
|Games lost || 13 (9 OTP Bank Liga, 1 UEFA Europa League, 0 Hungarian Cup and 3 Hungarian League Cup)
|-
|Goals scored || 52
|-
|Goals conceded || 42
|-
|Goal difference || +10
|-
|Yellow cards || 52
|-
|Red cards || 3
|-
|rowspan="2"|Worst discipline ||  László Zsidai (7 , 0 )
|-
|  Rafe Wolfe (7 , 0 )
|-
|rowspan="2"|Best result || 3–0 (H) v Egri FC - OTP Bank Liga - 15-09-2012
|-
| 3–0 (A) v Egri FC - OTP Bank Liga - 06-04-2012
|-
|rowspan="1"|Worst result || 0–3 (A) v Szombathelyi Haladás - OTP Bank Liga - 21-09-2012
|-
|rowspan="1"|Most appearances ||  Sándor Hidvégi (37 appearances)
|-
|rowspan="1"|Top scorer ||  József Kanta (10 goals)
|-
|Points || 58/117 (49.57%)
|-

Nemzeti Bajnokság I

Matches

Classification

Results summary

Results by round

Hungarian Cup

League Cup

Group stage

Classification

Europa League

The First and Second Qualifying Round draws took place at UEFA headquarters in Nyon, Switzerland on 25 June 2012.

References

External links
 Eufo
 Official Website
 UEFA
 fixtures and results

MTK Budapest FC seasons
Mtk Budapest